CSPD may refer to:

 Colorado Springs Police Department, Colorado, U.S.
 Center for the Study of the Public Domain, at Duke University Law School, North Carolina, U.S.
 Client-side persistent data, a term for storing data required by web application
 CSPD (molecule), a chemical reagent for enzyme-linked immunosorbent assay (ELISA) staining
 Calendar of State Papers Domestic, see HMS Royal Oak (1664)
 Christlich-Soziale Partei Deutschlands, see Peter-Michael Diestel
 Civil Status and Passport Department, the government office that issues Jordanian passports